Douglas Collier is a Paralympic athlete from United States competing mainly in category P44 pentathlon events.

He competed in the 1996 Summer Paralympics in Atlanta, United States.  There he won a bronze medal in the men's Pentathlon - P44 event, a bronze medal in the men's 4 x 100 metre relay - T42-46 event, and finished eleventh in the men's Discus throw - F43-44 event.

References

External links
 

Paralympic track and field athletes of the United States
Athletes (track and field) at the 1996 Summer Paralympics
Paralympic bronze medalists for the United States
American pentathletes
American male sprinters
American male discus throwers
Living people
Medalists at the 1996 Summer Paralympics
Year of birth missing (living people)
Paralympic medalists in athletics (track and field)
Sprinters with limb difference
Discus throwers with limb difference
Paralympic sprinters
Paralympic discus throwers